was a Japanese politician of the Liberal Democratic Party, a member of the House of Councillors in the Diet (national legislature). A native of Jōhana, Toyama and graduate of Keio University, he had served in the town assembly of Jōhana for three terms since 1964 and in the assembly of Toyama Prefecture for eight terms since 1975. He was elected to the House of Councillors for the first time in 2004.

References

External links 
 Official website in Japanese.

1937 births
2017 deaths
Members of the House of Councillors (Japan)
Liberal Democratic Party (Japan) politicians
Politicians from Toyama Prefecture